Anni Steuer, later Ludewig, (12 February 1913 – 1990s) was a German athlete who competed mainly in the 80 metre hurdles. She won the silver medal for her native country at the 1936 Summer Olympics held in Berlin, Germany. Her time in the final was 11.7 seconds (electronic timing gave 11.809), her lifetime best. Steuer was born in Metz which at the time of her birth was part of Germany; after World War I it reverted to France.

References 

1913 births
1990s deaths
Sportspeople from Metz
Athletes (track and field) at the 1936 Summer Olympics
German female hurdlers
Olympic athletes of Germany
Olympic silver medalists for Germany
People from Alsace-Lorraine
Lorraine-German people
Medalists at the 1936 Summer Olympics
Olympic silver medalists in athletics (track and field)